New Day may refer to:

Music 
"New Day" (50 Cent song), a July 2012 song by American rapper 50 Cent
"New Day" (Wyclef Jean song), a charity song by Wyclef Jean and Bono, from the 1989 album The Ecleftic: 2 Sides II a Book
"New Day" (Tamar Kaprelian song), a song by Tamar Kaprelian from her 2009 album, Sinner or a Saint
"New Day" (Alicia Keys song), a November 2012 song by American R&B singer Alicia Keys
"New Day" (Patti LaBelle song), a May 2004 song by Patti LaBelle
"New Day", a song by Take That from their album Wonderland
"New Day", also known as "You Are the New Day", a 1978 song by John David
"New Day", a song by Hollywood Undead on their 2013 album Notes From The Underground
"New Day", a song by Jay-Z and Kanye West from their 2011 collaborative album Watch the Throne
"New Day", a song by  Miz from her September 2004 album Say It's Forever
"New Day", a song by Joe Satriani from his 1986 album Not of This Earth

Professional wrestling 
WWE The Music: A New Day, Vol. 10 released 2010
The New Day (professional wrestling), a stable in professional wrestling formed in 2014

Media
The New Day (newspaper), a British newspaper published between 29 February and 6 May 2016
New Day (TV series), a CNN morning weekday news program

Literature 
New Day (novel), a 1948 novel by Jamaican writer V. S. Reid

See also 
 Newday
 NewDay (company)
 A New Day (disambiguation)
 New Day Dawning (disambiguation)